Irina Churilova is a Russian soprano opera singer, soloist of the Novosibirsk Opera and Ballet Theatre (2008–2018) and the Mariinsky Theatre (since 2018).

Biography
Irina Churilova was born in Novosibirsk. The future singer studied in the physics and mathematics class of Novosibirsk School No. 28, from which she graduated with a silver medal. Then she entered the Novosibirsk Institute of Railway Engineers (NIIZhT) to get the profession of an engineer-economist, but during the entrance exams Churilova realized that she wanted to arrange her life differently and entered the Novosibirsk Musical College named after Askold Murov (some sources describe the singer's educational career in different ways. For example, in one of the interviews, Churilova does not say anything about NIIZhT, but mentions the choir school in Novosibirsk, where she first came to an open lesson in October 1991 and graduated in 2000, after which, according to her, she immediately began studying at the Novosibirsk Musical College named after Murov. However, the choir school is not mentioned in other sources).

In 2008 Churilova came to the Novosibirsk Opera Theatre when she was a student at the Novosibirsk Conservatory.

In 2009 she graduated from the Novosibirsk Conservatory (class of Zinaida Didenko).

Subsequently, she continued to improve herself and attended master classes with Diane Zola (Houston Grand Opera, United States), and also trained with the vocal teacher Enzo Ferrara (La Scala Theater). Moreover, the singer attended master classes of Montserrat Caballé, who twice invited Churilova to take part in concerts dedicated to the notable Spanish singer at the Liceu Theater in Barcelona (in 2012 and 2014).

Break with Novosibirsk Opera Theatre
In 2018 the soloist broke off relations with the Novosibirsk Opera Theatre.

She appeared on the Novosibirsk stage for the last time on 22 May, when she sang the part of Amelia in Verdi's Un Ballo in Maschera.

On 14 December 2018, the soloist officially left the theatre.

Career at the Mariinsky Theatre
In 2018, the singer became a soloist with the Mariinsky Theatre, although she made her debut at this theater back in 2013. She sang in the premieres of the performances The Queen of Spades (2015), Simone Boccanegra (2016), The Maid of Orleans (2021), etc. At the present time Irina Churilova is leading soprano of Mariinsky Theatre. She regularly performs more than 30 leading soprano roles of Russian, Italian, German and French repertoire, mostly in Tchaikovsky, Verdi, Wagner, Rimsky-Korsakov and Puccini operas:

Tatiana (Eugene Onegin) 
Agnès Sorel (The Maid of Orleans) 
Maria (Mazepa) 
Liza (The Queen of Spades) 
Iolanta (Iolanta) 
Princess Olga (The Maid of Pskov) 
Vera Sheloga (The Noblewoman Vera Sheloga) 
Oxana (Christmas Eve) 
Tsaritsa Militrisa (The Tale of Tsar Saltan) 
Fevroniya (The Legend of the Invisible City of Kitezh and the Maiden Fevroniya) 
Parasha (Mavra) 
Princess Urusova (Boyarina Morozova) 
Leonora (Il trovatore) 
Elena (I vespri siciliani) 
Amelia Grimaldi (Simon Boccanegra) 
Amelia (Un ballo in maschera) 
Leonora (La forza del destino) 
Elisabeth de Valois (Don Carlo) 
Aida (Aida) 
Gioconda (La Gioconda, concert performance) 
Desdemona (Verdi’s Otello) 
Mimì (La Bohème) 
Adriana (Adriana Lecouvreur) 
Liù (Turandot) 
Elisabeth (Tannhäuser) 
Elsa (Lohengrin) 
Eva (Die Meistersinger von Nürnberg, concert performance) 
Marguerite (Gounod’s Faust) 
Micaëla (Carmen) 
Soprano part in Verdi’s Requiem

Irina Churilova participated in international tours of Mariinsky as Iolanta in “Iolanta” in Rome, Hamburg, Munich (2018), Berlin, Luzern, Budapest, Paris (2019), as Lisa in “The queen of spades” in Baden-Baden (2015), Schanghai (2016) and Tokyo (2019), as Elisabeth in “Don Carlo” (Tokyo, 2019)  .

Awards
 Laureate of the III Russian Vocal Competition named after V. Barsova (Sochi, 2007; 1st prize)
 Laureate of the XLIX International Vocal Competition in Toulouse (2012; second Grand Prix)
 Finalist of the XXI International Operalia Competition (Verona, 2013)
 Laureate of the XXXIII International Hans Gabor Belvedere Singing Competition (Düsseldorf, 2014; 1st Prize and Audience Award)
 Laureate of the LI Francisco Viñas International Vocal Competition (Barcelona, 2014; IV prize and special prize for the best performance of Russian music)

References

Living people
21st-century Russian women opera singers
Russian operatic sopranos
Musicians from Novosibirsk
Novosibirsk Opera and Ballet Theatre
Novosibirsk Conservatory alumni
Year of birth missing (living people)